The Coca-Cola Building (also called the Coca-Cola Company Building) is a building located at 1322–1336 S. Wabash Ave. in the Near South Side community area of Chicago, Illinois, which once served as the Chicago headquarters of The Coca-Cola Company. The building was designed by Frank Abbott in the Commercial style and built from 1903 to 1904. When it opened, the building was eight stories high; two additional stories were added in 1913. The building features limestone with iron ornaments on its first two stories; a cornice with a terra cotta fretwork pattern at the top separates the second and third floors. The top of the building features a terra cotta frieze and a cornice with decorative patterns. The Coca-Cola Company operated out of the building from 1904 until 1928; the building was the company's second office outside of Atlanta. The building was the only Coca-Cola syrup manufacturing plant in the Midwest until 1915; it is now the only surviving Coca-Cola plant from before World War II outside of Atlanta.

The Coca-Cola Building was added to the National Register of Historic Places on February 22, 1991.

References

Commercial buildings on the National Register of Historic Places in Chicago
Chicago school architecture in Illinois
Commercial buildings completed in 1904
Office buildings in Chicago